Hideo Gotoh is a Japanese former international table tennis player.

He won a bronze medal at the 1979 World Table Tennis Championships in the Swaythling Cup (men's team event) with Hiroyuki Abe, Masahiro Maehara, Seiji Ono and Norio Takashima for Japan.

He then won another bronze medal at the 1981 World Table Tennis Championships.

See also
 List of table tennis players
 List of World Table Tennis Championships medalists

References

Japanese male table tennis players
Living people
World Table Tennis Championships medalists
Year of birth missing (living people)